Fábio Henrique Simplício (born 23 September 1979) is a Brazilian retired footballer who played as a midfielder.

He appeared in 243 Serie A games for three clubs and scored 43 goals, having played for nearly a decade in the country.

Club career

São Paulo / Move to Italy
Born in São Paulo, Simplício started his career with hometown's São Paulo FC, going on to remain five years with the club and winning two State Leagues. In 2004, he moved to Italy and signed for Parma FC, after having been discovered by its director of football Arrigo Sacchi.

Simplício made his Serie A debut on 22 September 2004 in a 1–2 home loss against Bologna F.C. 1909, one day shy of his 25th birthday (16 minutes played), and finished his first season with four goals in 34 games, bettering that total to ten in the following campaign.

Palermo
On 14 June 2006 Simplício joined fellow top division side U.S. Città di Palermo, moving alongside Parma teammate Mark Bresciano. He was priced at €7.1 million, with €4.6 million being to his previous team.

During his four-year spell with the Sicilian club, Simplício appeared in more than 26 league matches, adding eight UEFA Cup appearances in two separate seasons combined (two goals). In January 2010, his agent Gilmar Rinaldi announced he would not extend his contract with Palermo, set to expire in June.

Roma
On 1 June 2010, Simplício moved to A.S. Roma on a three-year contract worth €1.8m per season, effective as of 1 July. He scored four league goals from 24 appearances in his debut campaign, adding the 2–1 winner against S.S. Lazio for the Coppa Italia as the capital side reached the semifinals.

In 2011–12, Simplício netted the same number of goals, including one in a Derby del Sole against S.S.C. Napoli in a 3–1 away triumph, but Roma could only finish seventh, thus not qualifying for any European competition.

Cerezo Osaka
On 27 July 2012, Simplício joined J1 League's Cerezo Osaka. He made his official debut on 4 August against Consadole Sapporo, contributing to the 4–0 victory.

International career
On 17 November 2009, aged 30, Simplício earned his first and only cap for Brazil, in a friendly match with Oman. He came on as a substitute for Felipe Melo in the second half of the 2–0 win.

Business career
Simplício owned American soccer team Miami Dade FC and software Ginga Scout, alongside fellow former footballers such as Emerson, Roberto Linck or Roberto Carlos.

Career statistics

Club
Source:

International

Honours

Club
São Paulo
Campeonato Paulista: 2000, 2002
Torneio Rio – São Paulo: 2001

Individual
Bola de Prata: 2002

References

External links
 
 
 

1979 births
Living people
Footballers from São Paulo
Brazilian footballers
Association football midfielders
Campeonato Brasileiro Série A players
São Paulo FC players
Serie A players
Parma Calcio 1913 players
Palermo F.C. players
A.S. Roma players
J1 League players
Cerezo Osaka players
Vissel Kobe players
Brazil international footballers
Brazilian expatriate footballers
Expatriate footballers in Italy
Expatriate footballers in Japan
Brazilian expatriate sportspeople in Italy
Brazilian expatriate sportspeople in Japan